The 2017 Liga 3 Central Java season is the third edition of Liga 3 Central Java is a qualifying round of the 2017 Liga 3. Persiku Kudus are the defending champions.

The competition scheduled starts in April 2017.

Teams
This season there are 14 Central Java club participants, divided into 3 group of 4 and 5.

First round
Divided into 3 group of 4 and 5, winner and runner-up of each group qualify for the semi final 2017 Liga 3 Central Java.

Group A

Group B

Group C

Second round

Group D

Group E

Final

References 

2017 in Indonesian football
Sport in Central Java